The Proto-Villanovan culture was a late Bronze Age culture that appeared in Italy in the first half of the 12th century BC and lasted until the 10th century BC, part of the central European Urnfield culture system (1300-750 BCE).

History

Proto-Villanovan culture was part of the central European Urnfield culture system. Similarity in particular has been noted with the regional groups of Bavaria-Upper Austria and of the middle-Danube. Furthermore the Proto-Villanovan culture shows affinities with both the Lusatian and Canegrate cultures. Another hypothesis, however, is that it was a derivation from the previous Terramare culture of the Po Valley. The burial characteristics relate the Proto-Villanovan culture to the Central European Urnfield culture and Celtic Hallstatt culture that succeeded it. It is not possible to tell these apart in their earlier stages. Various authors, such as Marija Gimbutas, associated this culture with the arrival, or the spread, of the proto-Italics into the Italian peninsula. 

Proto-Villanovan sites are present all over the Italian peninsula, mostly in the northern-central part but also, to a lesser degree, in Southern Italy and eastern Sicily. Among the most important of these sites are: Frattesina (Veneto), Bismantova and Ripa Calbana (Emilia-Romagna), Cetona and Saturnia (Tuscany), Monti della Tolfa (Lazio), Pianello di Genga and Ancona (Marche), Ortucchio (Abruzzo), Timmari (Basilicata), Canosa (Apulia), Tropea (Calabria) and Milazzo (Sicily).

Settlements, usually of small dimensions, were generally built on hills and circumscribed with fortifications. The economy was mostly based on agro-pastoral activities, metallurgy and trades.

Society

Burial rites 
The proto-Villanovans practiced cremation. The ashes were placed in Urnfield-style double-cone shaped funerary urns, often decorated with geometric designs, and then buried in the ground. Elite graves containing jewellery, bronze armour and horse harness fittings were separated from ordinary graves, showing for the first time the development of a highly hierarchical society, so characteristic of Indo-European cultures.

Regionalization

After a period of considerable uniformity from north to south, the Proto-Villanovan culture shows a process of regionalization. Starting from c. 950 BC, new regional cultures such as the Villanovan culture, Este culture and Latial culture appeared. Although these new cultures shared many similarities with the preceding Proto-Villanovan culture, especially funerary customs, they also exhibited their own innovations.

Genetics
A genetic study published in Science in November 2019 examined the remains of a female from the Proto-Villanovan culture buried in Martinsicuro, Italy between ca. 930 BC and 839 BC, in the territory of the Picentes. She carried the maternal haplogroup U5a2b.

References

Sources

See also
 Villanovan culture
 Latial culture 
 Este culture

12th-century BC establishments
10th-century BC disestablishments
Urnfield culture
Archaeological cultures of Southern Europe
Archaeological cultures in Italy
Italic archaeological cultures
Bronze Age cultures of Europe
Villanovan culture